Shane Stephen Rattenbury (born 25 August 1971), is the Attorney-General of the ACT and former Speaker of the ACT Legislative Assembly, and a member of the multi-member district unicameral Australian Capital Territory Legislative Assembly representing the electorate of Molonglo from 2008 to 2016 and the electorate of Kurrajong since 2016 for the ACT Greens. He was the first Speaker in any Parliament in the world representing a Green political party.

Early life, education and career before politics
Rattenbury first moved to Canberra in 1984. He attended Canberra Grammar School and went on to gain a BEc and LLB(Honours) from the Australian National University and commenced employment, working with the Australian Government Department of Industry, Science and Tourism. Prior to his election to the Assembly, Rattenbury travelled between Amsterdam and Australia as the International Political Director of Greenpeace International. During this time, he gained publicity for his work on global campaigns on climate change and whaling.

Political career
In the 1996 federal election, Rattenbury was the Greens candidate for the newly-created Division of Namadgi in the southern suburbs of Canberra. He came in 3rd with 7.22% of the primary vote.

Rattenbury stood for election to the ACT Legislative Assembly at the 2001 ACT election, as a candidate in the electorate of Ginninderra for the ACT Greens. After the distribution of preferences, Rattenbury was defeated by both Labor's Wayne Berry and the Australian Democrats' Roslyn Dundas.

In June 2008, the ACT Greens announced that Rattenbury would again stand as a candidate for election in the electorate of Molonglo. Independent polling released in October suggested the Green vote had doubled since the last election at the expense of Labor, with the Liberal vote remaining relatively unchanged. Commentators predicted the Greens would hold the balance of power and decide who forms government. The Greens stated they were willing to court both major parties. With 82.1 per cent of the vote counted, Labor had obtained 37.6 per cent of the vote, with the Liberals at 31.1 per cent and the Greens at 15.8 per cent. Swings were recorded against both Labor (−9.3 per cent) and the Liberals (−3.7 per cent) with a +6.6 per cent swing towards the Greens, resulting in the election of Rattenbury, Meredith Hunter, Amanda Bresnan, and Caroline Le Couteur.

Parliamentary career and election as Speaker
After deliberations with both the Labor and Liberal parties, the Greens chose to support a Labor minority government. Hunter was a key negotiator of the Parliamentary Agreement between the ACT Greens and the Labor Party. Under the agreement, the Greens secured a range of policy outcomes in the areas of schools and education, health service provision, housing, public transport and gay rights. It also ensures that the Greens will Chair three of the Assembly's key committees. In exchange, the Greens agreed to maintain confidence in Chief Minister, Jon Stanhope. The Greens also secured Government support for the nomination of Rattenbury as Assembly Speaker. While on the cross bench in the 7th Assembly, Rattenbury was Greens spokesperson in the portfolios of Attorney-General, Environment, Climate Change and Water, Energy, Police and Emergency Services, Tourism, Sport and Recreation.

Ministerial roles
Following the 2012 ACT election, Rattenbury was the only Greens MLA to retain his seat in the Assembly. With the election resulting in a hung parliament, Rattenbury, who held the balance of power, announced he would support Katy Gallagher and the Labor Party in the formation of government. The ACT Labor Caucus agreed to appoint Rattenbury as a minister in Gallagher's five-member cabinet, and to support 100 Greens policies. Rattenbury served as the ACT Minister for Ageing, Minister for Housing, Minister for Corrections, Minister for Aboriginal and Torres Strait Islander Affairs, as well as, Minister for Territory and Municipal Services in the Second Gallagher Ministry and the First Barr Ministry.

Rattenbury was re-elected at the 2016 ACT election. Following the election, Rattenbury was joined by party colleague Caroline Le Couteur in the Legislative Assembly, taking the Greens tally to 2 out of 25 total seats in the Assembly. Rattenbury subsequently struck a deal with the minority Labor Government to retain a place in the cabinet as the Minister for Climate Change and Sustainability, Minister for Justice, Consumer Affairs and Road Safety, Minister for Corrections, and Minister for Mental Health. Although a member of the Barr government, he reserved the right to withdraw from Cabinet discussions on divisive issues and vote independently in the Assembly.

Re-elected again at the 2020 ACT election with six Greens elected to the then 25 member Assembly, the Greens negotiated a Parliamentary and Governing Agreement with Labor which saw three Greens enter the Ministry. Rattenbury holds the portfolios of Attorney-General, Minister for Water, Energy and Emissions Reduction, Minister for Gaming and Minister for Consumer Affairs.

See also

 2008 Australian Capital Territory general election
 Members of the Australian Capital Territory Legislative Assembly, 2008–2012

References

External links
Shane Rattenbury: Website
 Shane Rattenbury: ACT Legislative Assembly website
 Shane Rattenbury's Inaugural Speech to the ACT Legislative Assembly (11 December 2008)
 Shane Rattenbury on Greenpeace TV

1971 births
Living people
Australian Greens members of the Australian Capital Territory Legislative Assembly
Australian public servants
Members of the Australian Capital Territory Legislative Assembly
Speakers of the Australian Capital Territory Legislative Assembly
People associated with Greenpeace
People educated at Canberra Grammar School
21st-century Australian politicians